CBWK-FM is the callsign of the CBC Radio One station in Thompson, Manitoba. The station broadcasts at 100.9 MHz. The station's studios are located on Selkirk Avenue in Thompson.

History
The station signed on in 1980. Although separately licensed, for all intents and purposes it was a rebroadcaster of Winnipeg's CBW. It was upgraded to a full CBC production centre in 1994 to improve local service in rural northern Manitoba. The station also formerly produced a special evening program for the region's large First Nations population, in conjunction with Native Communications, but with the launch of NCI's own radio network this has been discontinued.

Local programming
CBWK formerly aired a local morning and midday show called North Country. However, following the departure of the program's lone host in January of 2020, local programming from Thompson has been suspended, and the station has instead broadcast programming from CBW in Winnipeg during CBC Radio One's local programming blocks.

Rebroadcasters

Two transmitters also rebroadcast the programming of CBWK-FM, but are owned by local community groups rather than by the CBC.

Notable on-air personalities
The National anchor Peter Mansbridge began his broadcasting and CBC career at CHFC from 1968 to 1971.

Notes
CHFC, a radio station which was originally launched in 1948 at Churchill, became a rebroadcaster of CBWK-FM in 2001.

References

External links
 CBC Manitoba
 
 

Bwk
Bwk
Thompson, Manitoba
Radio stations established in 1980
1980 establishments in Manitoba